North Dry Sac River is a stream in northern Greene and southern Polk counties in the Ozarks of southwest Missouri.

North Dry Sac River, a tributary of the Little Sac River, was named for its tendency to run dry.

See also
List of rivers of Missouri

References

Rivers of Greene County, Missouri
Rivers of Polk County, Missouri
Rivers of Missouri